Juraj Kotula (born 30 September 1995) is a Slovak footballer who currently plays for Zemplín Michalovce.

Club career

ŠK Slovan Bratislava
Kotula made his professional Fortuna Liga debut for Slovan Bratislava on 27 February 2015 against Žilina.

International career
Kotula was called up for two unofficial friendly fixtures held in Abu Dhabi, UAE, in January 2017, against Uganda and Sweden. He capped his debut against Uganda, being fielded for the first half, before being substituted by Martin Šulek at the start of the second half. Slovakia went on to lose the game 1–3. Kotula did not start in a 0–6 loss to Sweden later that week.

References

External links
 ŠK Slovan Bratislava profile 
 
 Futbalnet profile 

1995 births
Living people
Footballers from Bratislava
Slovak footballers
Slovakia under-21 international footballers
Slovakia international footballers
Association football defenders
ŠK Slovan Bratislava players
FK Senica players
FC ViOn Zlaté Moravce players
FC Zbrojovka Brno players
MFK Zemplín Michalovce players
Slovak Super Liga players
Czech National Football League players
Expatriate footballers in the Czech Republic
Slovak expatriate sportspeople in the Czech Republic